is a Japanese gravure idol and tarento signed to Free Style Company. Minami's recognition as a model has also spread beyond Japan and she was named as one of the "7 most irresistibly cute Japanese idols" by the Thailand version of FHM magazine in 2010. On her official Instagram page, she announced her marriage to Japanese comedian Masaru Hamaguchi.

Filmography

Movies
Wanna be Free!: Tokyo Girl (2006) as amateur model
Chorus-tai: Kanojotachi no Kiseki (2007) as Aki
Buraburabanban (2008)
Cho Kamen Rider Den-O & Decade Neo Generations: The Onigashima Warship (2009) as Toki
Ju-on: Shiroi Rōjo (2009) as Akane

TV dramas
Shibatora: Dōgan Keiji Shibata Taketora (2008) as Tamaki Ayukawa
Maison Ikkoku (26 July 2008) as Kozue Nanao
Real Clothes (16 September 2008) as Hitomi Hanada
Magic x Warrior Magi Majo Pures! (1 April 2018) as Hōko Minami

TV programmes
 Sakiyomi Jan Bang!
 Pretty Rhythm Aurora Dream

Video games
Akina Minami appeared in several posters in the Sony PlayStation 3 video game, Metal Gear Solid 4: Guns of the Patriots.
Akina Minami is a playable avatar in the Japanese Cardass game Dragon Ball Heroes, she is a female Saiyan who is able to learn and use various attacks from other characters.

Clothing brand
Akina Minami launched a clothing brand named after her. Her clothing brand includes kimono and Western style couture outfits for children.

References

Sources

External links
Akina Minami official website 
 

1989 births
Japanese gravure models
Japanese actresses
Living people
People from Kanagawa Prefecture
People from Yokohama
Japanese television personalities
Japanese female models
Musicians from Kanagawa Prefecture